Yan Zi and Zheng Jie were the defending champions but Zheng did not compete. Yan partnered with Peng Shuai  but lost in the quarterfinals to Alicia Molik and Mara Santangelo.

Cara Black and Liezel Huber defeated Katarina Srebotnik and Ai Sugiyama in the final, 3–6, 6–3, 6–2 to win the ladies' doubles tennis title at the 2007 Wimbledon Championships.

Seeds

  Lisa Raymond /  Samantha Stosur (semifinals)
  Cara Black /  Liezel Huber (champions)
  Chan Yung-jan /  Chuang Chia-jung (third round)
  Katarina Srebotnik /  Ai Sugiyama (final)
  Květa Peschke /  Rennae Stubbs (quarterfinals)
  Alicia Molik /  Mara Santangelo (semifinals)
  Janette Husárová /  Meghann Shaughnessy (third round)
  Anabel Medina Garrigues /  Virginia Ruano Pascual (third round)

  Tathiana Garbin /  Paola Suárez (first round)
  Elena Likhovtseva /  Sun Tiantian (quarterfinals)
  Maria Elena Camerin / Gisela Dulko (first round)
  Maria Kirilenko /  Elena Vesnina (third round)
  Dinara Safina /  Roberta Vinci (first round)
  Vera Dushevina /  Tatiana Perebiynis (first round)
  Vania King /  Jelena Kostanić Tošić (first round)
  Sania Mirza /  Shahar Pe'er (third round)

Qualifying

Draw

Finals

Top half

Section 1

Section 2

Bottom half

Section 3

Section 4

References

External links

2007 Wimbledon Championships on WTAtennis.com
2007 Wimbledon Championships – Women's draws and results at the International Tennis Federation

Women's Doubles
Wimbledon Championship by year – Women's doubles
Wimbledon Championships
Wimbledon Championships